"Ten Little Indians" is a modern children's rhyme.

Ten Little Indians may also refer to:

Literature
 A previous title of And Then There Were None, a 1939 novel by Agatha Christie
 A previous title of the 1943 play, And Then There Were None, by Agatha Christie adapting her novel
 Ten Little Indians (1965 film), an adaptation of Christie's novel directed by George Pollock
 Ten Little Indians (1974 film), or And Then There Were None, an adaptation of Christie's novel, directed by Peter Collinson
 Ten Little Indians (1989 film), an adaptation of Christie's novel, directed by Alan Birkinshaw
 Ten Little Indians (short story collection), a 2003 collection by Sherman Alexie

Music 
 "Ten Little Indians" (The Beach Boys song), 1962
 "Ten Little Indians" (Harry Nilsson song), also covered by The Yardbirds, 1967
 "Ten Little Indians", a song by The Bastard Fairies from Memento Mori
 "Ten Little Indians", a song from the 2008 rock musical Bloody Bloody Andrew Jackson

Other uses
 "Ten Little Indians" (Davey and Goliath), an episode of the TV series Davey and Goliath
 Ten Little Indians, a 1983 computer game written by Brian Howarth

See also

 
 
 
 
 "Ten Little Injuns", an 1868 song written by Septimus Winner
 Ten Little Niggers (disambiguation), a variant title of the children's rhyme
 And Then There Were None (disambiguation), other adaptations of Christie
 Indian (disambiguation)
 Little (disambiguation)